John Michael Toudouze (born April 27, 1983) is a former American football offensive tackle. He was drafted by the Indianapolis Colts in the fifth round of the 2006 NFL Draft. He played college football at TCU.

Toudouze was also a member of the New York Sentinels, Tennessee Titans, Florida Tuskers and San Diego Chargers.

Early years
Toudouze grew up in San Antonio, and was an all-district football player at East Central High School.

College career
At TCU, he spent most of his early years as the backup to former Miami Dolphins' offensive tackle Anthony Alabi.  He became the starter as a senior in 2005, and was named First-team All-MWC as the Horned Frogs went 10-2 to win the conference championship.

Professional career
In his rookie year with the NFL, Toudouze was a member of the Indianapolis Colts' Super Bowl XLI championship team.

On September 29, 2007, the Colts released him at the end of training camp. He was re-signed on November 10, and made his NFL debut a day later on Sunday Night Football against the San Diego Chargers. On December 9, 2009, Toudouze was re-signed by the Colts.

On August 10, 2010, he signed with the Tennessee Titans.

The San Diego Chargers signed him on August 8, 2012, but was terminated on August 27, 2012.

References

External links
TCU Horned Frogs bio
San Diego Chargers bio

1983 births
Living people
Players of American football from San Antonio
American football offensive guards
American football offensive tackles
TCU Horned Frogs football players
Indianapolis Colts players
New York Sentinels players
Tennessee Titans players
Florida Tuskers players
San Diego Chargers players